Edward Coffman may refer to:

 Edward M. Coffman, military historian
 Edward G. Coffman Jr. (born 1934), computer scientist
 Edward N. Coffman (1942–2014), American accounting scholar and professor of accounting